Stephen Murphy (born 5 April 1978 in Dublin) is a former Irish professional footballer who played for Belvedere, Huddersfield Town and Halifax Town, for whom he made 25 Football League appearances. He has also played for the Ireland U-21's.Republic of Ireland U-18’s

Honours
Republic of Ireland
FIFA World Youth Championship Third Place: 1997

External links

1978 births
Living people
Association footballers from Dublin (city)
Republic of Ireland association footballers
Republic of Ireland under-21 international footballers
Huddersfield Town A.F.C. players
Halifax Town A.F.C. players
English Football League players
Belvedere F.C. players
Association football midfielders